The 1959–60 European Cup was the third edition of Europe's premier club handball tournament.

Knockout stage

Round 1

	

	

|}

	
|}

Quarterfinals

	
	
	

|}

Semifinals

|}

Finals

|}

External links 
 EHF Champions League website
 1960 edition

EHF Champions League seasons
Champions League
Champions League